Qualification matches for the 1954 World Men's Handball Championship took place in 1953.

Games

References 

World Men's Championship qualification
1954 qualification
Qualification for handball competitions